The Second Goh Chok Tong Cabinet was formed after the 1991 Singaporean general election and dissolved for the 1997 Singaporean general election. The new Cabinet was formed due to Prime Minister, Goh Chok Tong, calling a snap election, seeking a strong and fresh mandate after succeeding Lee Kuan Yew as prime minister.

Ministers

References

 

Executive branch of the government of Singapore
Lists of political office-holders in Singapore
Cabinets established in 1991